Hakmana may refer to the following topics in Sri Lanka:

 Hakmana, Kandy
 Hakmana, Matara
 Hakmana Electoral District, 1947-1989